During the closing ceremony of the 2020 Summer Olympics in Tokyo, the flag bearers for the 205 National Olympic Committee's (NOCs) and the IOC Refugee Olympic Team will enter the Olympic Stadium. The flags of each country were not necessarily carried by the same flag bearer as in the opening ceremony. Due to COVID-19 related protocols, athletes had to leave Japan within 48 hours from completion of their final event, leaving some countries without representation during the closing ceremony. Flags of the countries without athletes present were instead carried by volunteers.

Countries and flagbearers 
The following is a list of each country's flag bearer. The list is sorted by the order in which each nation appears in the parade of nations. Names will be given as officially designated by the International Olympic Committee (IOC).

Because of the requirement that all competing athletes had to leave Tokyo within 48 hours of the completion of their events, not all of the National Olympic Committees were able to select a flag bearer for the closing ceremony, a games volunteer was represented instead.

Notes

References 

closing ceremony flag bearers 
Lists of Olympic flag bearers